Pelidnota virescens is a species of beetle of the family Scarabaeidae.

Description
Head, pronotum and legs usually are yellow or metallic green, while elyra are yellowish and longitudinally striated. Exterior borders of mandibles are deeply indented. Adults are nocturnal and feed on various trees, while larvae feed on rotten stumps.

Distribution
This species occurs in Mexico and Central America.

References
 Universal Biological Indexer
 Zipcodezoo
 Cutberto Pacheco, Cuauhtémoc Deloya, Pedro Cortés  Phytophagous scarab beetles from the Central Region of Guerrero, Mexico in Sociedad Colombiana de Entomología

External links
 Flower-beetles

Scarabaeidae
Beetles described in 1844
Beetles of North America